Regret was an unincorporated community in McMinn County, Tennessee, United States. Its post office has been closed.

Notes

Unincorporated communities in McMinn County, Tennessee
Unincorporated communities in Tennessee